Enrique Cabrero Mendoza was the director of CONACYT. He was also the general director of CIDE.

Education
He studied the degree in Administration at the Autonomous University of San Luis Potosi, graduating in 1977; subsequently, in 1980 he obtained a master's degree in Public Administration from the Center for Economic Research and Teaching (CIDE) as well as the Pedagogical Improvement Program from the Center d'Enseignement Supérieur des Affaires, CESA in France in 1982. In 2001 he obtained his PhD in Management Sciences from the HEC School in France.

Professional career 
From the beginning of his career, he began working as a research professor in various institutions. He was visiting professor at the  École Normale Supérieure  of Cachan, in France, at the University of Birmingham in Great Britain and at the Autonomous University of Barcelona in Spain, among others. In addition, he is a member of the National System of Researchers of the National Council of Science and Technology (CONACYT), Level III.
Since 1982 he served as professor-researcher of the Public Administration Division of the Center for Economic Research and Teaching (CIDE) since 1982 and in the year of 2004 he held the position of director of this Division, to later become director of said Center.

Other charges 
In 2011 he received the Caballero badge in the Order of the Academic Palms of the French ambassador in Mexico in recognition of his professional career in the academic and public administration fields.

He is founder of the magazine Gestión y Política Pública del (CIDE). Founder of the Government and Local Management Award that the CIDE carries out annually. Author of several books and articles on decentralization issues and local governments.

Among his most recent publications are "Federalism in the United Mexican States" that is part of the series "To Understand"; "Public action and local development" edited by the Economic Culture Fund and the book "The institutional design of science and technology policy in Mexico" done in co-authorship with Dr. Sergio López and Dr. Diego Valadés, published by the CIDE and the Legal Research Institute of the UNAM.

See also
CONACYT

References

External links
 https://web.archive.org/web/20060303205912/http://cide.edu.mx/investigador/profile.php?IdInvestigador=28 
 https://www.conacyt.gob.mx/ 
 https://www.cide.edu/ 

Living people
Mexican scientists
1956 births
Honorary Commanders of the Order of the British Empire